The Battle of Conjocta Creek was an attempt by British forces under the command of Lieutenant Colonel John Tucker to raid the American supply depots at the towns of Black Rock and Buffalo. The Raid was ordered by British Lieutenant General Gordon Drummond in hopes of causing an early American surrender at Fort Erie. On the morning of August 3, 1814, Tucker and his men met a small force of American riflemen under the command of Major Lodwick Morgan. After fighting for about an hour, Tucker and his men were defeated, and withdrew across the Niagara river to Canada. The battle played a major role in the Siege of Fort Erie's failure, due to the supply post at Black Rock being able to continue supplying the American force defending Fort Erie.  This resulted in the British eventually withdrawing from their siege positions around the fort to Chippawa on September 21st, 1814.

Background
Following the bloody but indecisive Battle of Lundy's Lane, The American Left Division now under the command of Brigadier General Edmund P. Gaines withdrew to Fort Erie, and created additional fortification extending from the actual stone fort, 800 yards southwest along the shore of Lake Erie. Drummond knew that any attack against the fort would be "An operation of Great Hazard". On August 2, hoping to destroy American supply depots in Buffalo and Black Rock, thus causing an early surrender of the American garrison of Fort Erie, Drummond dispatched Lieutenant Colonel John Tucker, the senior lieutenant colonel of the 41st Regiment of Foot, with 600 men to raid the two towns.

American Major Lodowick Morgan of the Regiment of Riflemen, who was based in Buffalo, New York, correctly deduced that the British were going to attack Buffalo from Canada by crossing the bridge at Conjocta Creek (also called Scajaquada). Morgan and 240 riflemen marched to the point where the road from Black Rock crossed the Conjocta. They sabotaged the bridge by pulling up a number of planks, then built breastworks at the south side. Afterwards, they continued on to Black Rock. Once at Black Rock, Morgan's troops marched back the way they came while playing music and making as much noise as possible to gain the attention of the British and make them believe the Americans were headed to Buffalo. Once out of sight, Morgan and his men marched secretly through the woods to occupy the breastworks they had constructed on the south bank of the creek.

Tucker's force consisted of two columns; one was composed of the two flank companies and four of the centre companies of the 41st Foot under Lieutenant Colonel Evans of the 41st, and other of the light companies of the 2nd Battalion, the 89th Foot and the 100th Foot, and the flank companies of the 104th (New Brunswick) Regiment, under Lieutenant Colonel William Drummond of Kelty, General Drummond's nephew. Some artillerymen were attached to the force.

Tucker and his men crossed the Niagara River into New York. They were spotted by American sentries under the command of Major Lodowick Morgan.

The Battle
The unsuspecting British arrived at the bridge and discovered the sabotage of the bridge While they halted to consider their options, Morgan began the battle by blowing a whistle to signal his soldiers, who fired a devastating volley. The British sought cover on the north bank and fired back, but the American troops remained protected behind their breastworks. The British attempted an assault on the breastworks, which the Americans repulsed. The British then attempted a flanking maneuver, which the Americans also repulsed. After an hour of fighting, Tucker, realizing the futility of carrying on the engagement, ordered a retreat, and withdrew to the Canadian side of the Niagara. The Americans lost two killed and eight wounded, while the British sustained twelve killed and twenty-one wounded.

Casualties
During the engagement, the British had lost 12 killed and 21 wounded, for a total of 33 killed and wounded. The Americans had lost 2 killed and 8 wounded, for a total of 10 killed and wounded.

Aftermath

Lodowick Morgan’s hit-and-run attack on British forces
After repelling the British at Conjocta Creek, Morgan was ordered by American high command to perform a reconnaissance with his riflemen on the British. Morgan was also given orders to attack the British and draw them out of their entrenched positions if possible. On August 5, 1814, Morgan attacked the British and drove them back to their lines; and for two hours he maneuvered in a way calculated to draw the main body out, but without success. Morgan withdrew back to the American camp with a loss of five men killed and four wounded. British casualties were ten British soldiers and five British-allied native Americans killed.

Lodowick Morgan’s second and final hit-and-run attack on British forces
On August 12, 1814. Major Morgan launched another hit-and-run attack on the British to support a detachment of 80 riflemen under American Captain Birdsall who had been sent to cut off a working party of the enemy, engaged in opening an avenue for a battery through the woods. The enemy were driven off. Though the British enemy were driven off, they were soon reinforced by more reinforcements. The firing lasted more than Major Morgan expected. The reinforced British soon proved too overwhelming. So Major Morgan gave the signal to withdraw by blowing his bugle. But at the same time a musket ball hit Major Morgan in the head killing him. Morgan’s men carried his deceased body and successfully withdrew from the field.

Later events at Fort Erie
Many of the British soldiers who fought at Conjocta Creek were bitter about Tucker's handling of the Battle. Tucker however blamed the defeat on his troops in a letter to Drummond. Drummond, who was furious about the defeat, sent out a general order criticizing the troops who fought in the battle, causing much resentment in the ranks. With the exception of its two flank companies, the 41st foot was sent back to Fort George several days later. The action had put the Americans on guard, and as a result of the British failure, the supply depots that were the objective of the raid were able to keep supplying the fort for the rest of the siege. Because of this, Drummond was unable to force an American surrender, which eventually led to the catastrophic British night assault on August 14.

References
Notes

Citations

Sources

Conjocta Creek
Conjocta Creek